Farr Building is a historical building located in Allentown, Pennsylvania. The building opened in 1907, and today is used as retail and residential space.

History

Prior to the Farr Building's construction, the site on which it was built had been used as a hospital facility. During the American Revolutionary War, the hospital was used in treating wounded and injured Continental Army troops.

The Farr Building was constructed on the site in 1906 and 1907 and opened officially in 1907. It was built by Harvey H. and Jacob L. Farr Jr., whose father, Jacob Farr Sr., had opened a shoe business in Allentown at the same location previously in June 1862. Jacob Farr learned the shoe trade in Philadelphia in 1852 when he was 14 years old. He operated the business at the site during the American Industrial Revolution in the late 19th Century, passing the business down to his family upon his death in April 1889 at the age of 51.

The family brought in a business partner, Nathan Hass, and the business was subsequently renamed Farr, Hass & Company. In 1898, the business expanded to large-scale manufacturing of shoes, operating as the Lehigh Valley Shoe Company, which was located at Chestnut and Howard streets in Allentown. Farr manufactured 1,000 shoes a day and sold them both at the store on 8th and Hamilton and to other area stores.  When describing the business, the owners stated that "There is nothing in the line of ladies' men's and children's shoes that cannot be supplied to their large trade from their establishment."

In 1900, Nathan Hass and Harvey Farr dissolved the partnership by mutual consent after Hass purchased the Cross Keys Hotel in Allentown, located on the northwest corner of Eighth and Hamilton streets (801 Hamilton) from the Hagenbuch family who had operated a tavern and later the hotel at the site since about 1800.  Hass tore down the hotel and erected a five-story building in 1901 and opened N.A. Hass & Son, a competitive shoe business, that he operated until 1912 when he sold the property and retired from the shoe business. 

In 1900, when Hass left the Farr company, Edgar Wenner was brought in by the family to replace him, and the company was renamed Farr Brothers' and Co. By this time, the business had expanded beyond its existing building, and a new, larger five-story building was constructed that exists on the site today.  It was designed by Allentown architects Rhue & Lange. The Farr company occupied the first floor with a retail store, the basement held the stockroom and company offices were on the fifth floor.  The second, third and fourth floors were rented space for business offices.

The company opened stores in Bethlehem in 1919, in Easton in 1910, in Reading in 1913, and in Harrisburg in 1953.  The company's slogan was "Better Shoes By Farr".

The building was remodeled in 1932 and again in 1965. The company thrived until the 1970s when, as with most downtown Allentown businesses, the central shopping district along Hamilton street suffered from the suburbanization and the building of shopping malls, which drew shoppers away from downtown.  In December 1985, the company announced that the store at 8th and Hamilton streets would end full retail service and become a self-service store. The company was sold to a New York City firm, and the Farr family left the shoe business.

In 1988, the building was taken over by a speculator. A family member, Harvey Farr, reacquired the property when the property speculator sold it. In August 1992, Farr sold the property to D.E. Jones Company, which sold discounted merchandise. By this time, the upper four floors were abandoned.

Current use
In 2004, the building was sold to Metropolis Management LLC, a development firm from New York City with a history of preserving historic structures.  The property was completely renovated and was retrofitted into luxury loft-style apartments. On December 1, 2005, the Farr Lofts were inaugurated with a public showing of a finished 2-bedroom model unit. An additional 19 units began occupancy in early 2006.  The ground floor is used as "The Villa" urban clothing store. 

In 2011, when demolition began for the PPL Center, an entire block along the north side of Hamilton Street between 7th and 8th streets was demolished except for The Farr Building and Dime Savings and Trust Company.  It was noted that "... Because of the improvements that have been made, it is probably the most valuable property on the block".  During the physical demolition work of buildings for the building of the PPL Center in 2012, it was found that the east wall of the Farr Building required additional shoring, and the wall was strengthened by a structural engineering team brought in to insure the building's stability.

Historical plaque
A historical plaque on the side of the building along North 8th Street states:  

The plaque was placed on the building in 1925 by the "Citizens of Allentown and Liberty Bell Chapter, Daughters of the American Revolution" in honor of many Allentown-area soldiers who fought with the Continental Army in the American Revolutionary War.

See also
 List of historic places in Allentown, Pennsylvania

References

External links

Official website

Buildings and structures in Allentown, Pennsylvania
History of Allentown, Pennsylvania